Flora of China may refer to:
 Flora of China (the People's Republic of China)
 Flora of Taiwan (the Republic of China)
 Flora of China (series), a scientific publication aimed at describing the plants native to China
 Flora Sinensis, a 1656 book by Michał Boym

See also
 Fauna of China